Deep Into Time is the debut studio album by the English pagan metal band Forefather, released in 1999 on Angelisc Enterprises, the band's own record label.  This album was later re-issued three times - in 2002 by Angelisc Enterprises with a bonus track "These Lands", in 2004 by Karmageddon Media with three bonus tracks including "These Lands" and in 2005 by Eisenwald Tonschmiede as an LP record (500 copies) including above-mentioned "These Lands" and one more song as bonus tracks.

Track listing

Personnel
Wulfstan - guitars, lead vocals, bass
Athelstan - guitars, backing vocals, bass, keyboards

1999 debut albums
Forefather albums
Karmageddon Media albums